Maro Bonsu-Maro (born 26 February 1997) is a Cook Islands footballer who currently plays for Manukau United and the Cook Islands national team.

Club career 
Bonsu-Maro competed in the 2017 OFC Champions League with Puaikura. He scored three goals in the Qualifying Stage. Later that year he joined Central United of the NRFL Premier. The following year he joined another Cook Islands club, Tupapa Maraerenga, and competed in the 2018 OFC Champions League. He went on to score a hattrick against Veitongo of Tonga and a brace against Pago Youth of American Samoa. He went on to score against Papua New Guinea's Lae City in the Group Stage. For the next season he joined Auckland City of the New Zealand Football Championship. He remained with the club through the 2021 season when he joined Manukau United of the Cook Islands Round Cup.

International 
Bonsu-Maro represented the Cook Islands, the country of his mother's birth, at the youth level level. He was part of the squad that competed in the 2013 OFC U-17 Championship in Vanuatu. He scored two goals in the team's opening match against Tonga. In 2019 he was included in the under-20 squad for the 2016 OFC U-20 Championship but ultimately did not compete.

In March 2022 Bonsu-Maro was included in the Cook Islands senior squad for 2022 FIFA World Cup qualification.

International career statistics

Personal
Bonsu-Maro was born in Auckland, New Zealand to a Pukapukan mother and a Ghanaian father.

References

External links
Soccerway profile

Living people
1997 births
Cook Island footballers
Cook Islands international footballers
New Zealand association footballers
Cook Island people of Ghanaian descent
New Zealand sportspeople of Cook Island descent
New Zealand people of Ghanaian descent
Association football defenders
Auckland City FC players